The  Korea Professional Baseball season was the 30th season in the history of the Korea Professional Baseball. The Samsung Lions won the regular season and Korean Series.

Format

Season Format
Regular Season: 133 games for each team
Semiplayoff: Regular Season 3rd place vs. Regular Season 4th place - Best of 5
Playoff: Regular Season 2nd place vs. Semiplayoff winner - Best of 5
Korean Series: Regular Season 1st place vs. Playoff winner - Best of 7

To Determine the Final Standings
Champion (1st place): Korean Series winner
Runner-up (2nd place): Korean Series loser
3rd–8th place: Sort by Regular Season record except teams to play in the Korean Series

Regular season

Post-Season

Semiplayoff

Playoff

Korean Series (Championship)

Foreign hitters

References

External links
Official Site

KBO League seasons
Korea Professional Baseball Season, 2011
Korea Korea Professional Baseball season